Ibrahim Rachidi (born 13 January 1980) is a professional footballer who currently plays as a defender for Consolat Marseille. He plays international football for Comoros and has won 13 caps for his country as of May 2016.

References
Ibrahim Rachidi career statistics at foot-national.com

1980 births
Living people
Footballers from Marseille
Comorian footballers
Comoros international footballers
French footballers
French sportspeople of Comorian descent
Association football defenders
FC Istres players
Bourges 18 players
Stade Malherbe Caen players
Karlsruher SC players
SO Cassis Carnoux players
Marignane Gignac Côte Bleue FC players
Gazélec Ajaccio players
ES Uzès Pont du Gard players
SC Toulon players
Athlético Marseille players
Ligue 2 players
Championnat National players
2. Bundesliga players